Begonia coccinea, the scarlet begonia, is a species of plant in the family Begoniaceae. It is native to the Atlantic Forest of Brazil.

References

coccinea
Flora of Brazil
Flora of the Atlantic Forest